Hauptfriedhof may refer to:

 Hauptfriedhof Karlsruhe, a cemetery in Karlsruhe, Germany
 Hauptfriedhof Ohlsdorf, a cemetery in Ohlsdorf, Germany
 Hauptfriedhof Frankfurt, a cemetery in Frankfurt, Germany